Lucas Scaglia (born 6 May 1987) is an Argentine football coach and former footballer who played as a midfielder. He grew up with Lionel Messi and today is his cousin-in-law.

Career

Scaglia signed for North American Soccer League side Jacksonville Armada on 30 January 2015, leaving the club at the end of the 2016 season.

In 2017, Scaglia joined California United FC II where he was a key member of the team which captured both the 2017 Spring & Fall United Premier Soccer League National Championships.

On 9 January 2019, Scaglia joined USL Championship side Las Vegas Lights.

Career statistics

Club

Personal life
Scagliari is childhood friends with Lionel Messi. It was as children that Messi met Scagliari's cousin Antonela Roccuzzo who he would eventually marry in 2017.

References

External links
 
 

1987 births
Living people
Association football midfielders
Argentine footballers
Argentine people of Italian descent
Newell's Old Boys footballers
Argentine Primera División players
PAS Giannina F.C. players
Panserraikos F.C. players
Football League (Greece) players
Club Bolívar players
Once Caldas footballers
Bolivian Primera División players
Deportivo Cali footballers
HNK Rijeka players
HNK Rijeka II players
Croatian Football League players
Jacksonville Armada FC players
North American Soccer League players
Las Vegas Lights FC players
Footballers from Rosario, Santa Fe